Dr. Knock (original title Knock) is a French comedy film from 1951, directed by Guy Lefranc, written by Georges Neveux, and starring Louis Jouvet. It also features an uncredited appearance by Louis de Funès. The movie is based on the 1923 theatre play Knock ou le Triomphe de la médecine (Knock or The Triumph of Medicine) by Jules Romains.

The film was remade in 2017 under the title Knock.

Summary 

The ambitious Dr. Knock arrives in the country village Saint-Maurice to succeed Dr. Parpalaid, an honest man whose patients are rare. The health of the villagers is excellent. Realizing that he was duped by his predecessor, Dr. Knock sets about convincing everyone that a healthy person is someone who doesn't know how sick he is. As a result, the whole village takes to bed, the hotel is transformed into a clinic, and even Dr. Parpalaid, who temporarily returns to his village, is so worried about his health following the "diagnosis" of Dr. Knock that he also ends up in bed.

Cast 
 Louis Jouvet: Dr. Knock
 Jean Brochard: Dr. Albert Parpalaid
 Pierre Renoir: Mousquet (the chemist)
 Pierre Bertin: Bernard (the teacher)
 Marguerite Pierry: Mrs. Pons (the lady in purple)
 Jean Carmet: a guy
 Yves Deniaud: the tambourine
 Mireille Perrey: Mrs. Rémy
 Jane Marken: Mrs. Parpalaid
 Louis de Funès (uncredited)

References

External links 
 
 Knock (1951) at the Films de France

1951 films
French comedy films
1950s French-language films
French black-and-white films
Films directed by Guy Lefranc
Remakes of French films
1951 comedy films
1950s French films